Ballarat North was an electoral district of the Legislative Assembly in the Australian state of Victoria. It was created in the redistribution preceding the 1955 election, covering the northern suburbs and the rural areas north of Ballarat.

Its mostly a safe seat for the Liberal Party, although Labor candidate and future Premier Steve Bracks came close to winning it in the 1988 election.

It was abolished in the redistribution preceding the 1992 election, mostly being replaced by the new district of Ballarat West.

Members for Ballarat North

Election results

References

Former electoral districts of Victoria (Australia)
1955 establishments in Australia
1992 disestablishments in Australia